Edward Lerner may refer to:

 Ned Lerner (fl. 1983–present), video game designer 
 Edward M. Lerner (born 1949), American author of science fiction, techno-thrillers, and popular science